Bud Shank Quartet at Jazz Alley is a live album by saxophonist Bud Shank recorded in 1986 and released on the Contemporary label.

Reception

Scott Yanow, writing for AllMusic, commented: "Shank is in top form, really stretching himself on the frequently challenging material. A good example of Bud Shank's playing in the 1980s".

Track listing
All compositions by Bud Shank, except as indicated
 "A Nightingale Sang in Berkeley Square" (Eric Maschwitz, Manning Sherwin) - 6:33	
 "Seaflowers" - 5:53
 "Too Long at the Fair" (Billy Barnes) - 7:56	
 "Arion" - 5:22
 "Song for Lady Lynn" - 9:30	
 "I Loves You Porgy" (George Gershwin, Ira Gershwin) - 4:56	
 "Wales" (Dave Peck) - 7:58	
 "Bud's Theme" - 2:04

Personnel
Bud Shank - alto saxophone
Dave Peck - piano
Chuck Deardorf - bass
Jeff Hamilton - drums

References

Contemporary Records live albums
Bud Shank live albums
1986 live albums